Circulisporites is a genus of plants. It is known from Triassic spores and pollen grains from the Ipswich coalfield in Queensland, Australia.

References

External links 

 

Prehistoric plant genera
Enigmatic plant taxa